Grundig Mobile was a brand licensed by Koç Holding of Turkey to Vitelcom of Spain for mobile phones and accessories. It was established in 2005. Grundig Mobile products were developed in conjunction with Purple Labs and SkySpring.
The product portfolio covered a wide spectrum of mobile technology, beginning with the low cost a-series of phones and ending with UMTS and other high-end products. In 2007 Vitelcom fell into administration and was wound up in 2008. Grundig Mobile phones are no longer made.

External links
Archived Grundig Mobile
Can the Mobile Cradle Be Used With More Than One Phone at a Time?
Purple Labs
SkySpring

Mobile phone companies of Spain
Mobile phone manufacturers